Apo Hiking Society (dose) is the fifth studio album of the Filipino trio Apo Hiking Society. It's an 11-track album released in 1982 under Universal (then known as WEA) Records.

Track listing
Mag-Artista Ka (4:09)
Araw (3:37)
Salawikain (4:25)
Bakit Ba? (3:38)
Inaamin Ko (3:32)
Pakinggan Mo (Ang Awit Ko) (3:36)
Tuyo Na'ng Damdamin (2:37)
Mahal Kita (Ngunit Ayaw Mo Sa Akin) (3:49)
Giliw (3:13)
Gabi Na Naman (4:41)
Blue Jeans (4:19)

Related links
The Official Apo Hiking Society Website 

APO Hiking Society albums
1982 albums